Andes may refer to:

Places
 Andes, the world's longest mountain range, along the western coast of South America
 Andes, New York, a town in the US
 Andes (CDP), New York, a hamlet in the US
 Andes, Antioquia, a town and municipality in Colombia
 Andés, a parish in Asturias, Spain
 Andes (Italy), ancient town, place of birth of Virgil

Acronym
 Architecture with non-sequential dynamic execution scheduling, a microprocessor architecture
 Public News Agency of Ecuador and South America, Ecuadorean state news agency
 Agua Negra Deep Experiment Site (ANDES), a proposed underground laboratory on the Argentina-Chile border

Other uses
 Andes (Andecavi), a people of ancient Gaul
 
 , an airline from Buenos Aires, Argentina
 Variant of the Illyrian name Andis
 , an ocean liner

See also
 Los Andes (disambiguation)
 Andean Community of Nations
 
Antes (name)